1819 in sports describes the year's events in world sport.

Boxing
Events
 Tom Cribb retains his English championship but no fights involving him are recorded in 1819.

Cricket
Events
 7 September — death of Lumpy Stevens, arguably the greatest bowler of the 18th century
England
 Most runs – Thomas Beagley 170 (HS 75)
 Most wickets – Thomas Howard 23 (BB 5–?)

Horse racing
England
 1,000 Guineas Stakes – Catgut
 2,000 Guineas Stakes – Antar
 The Derby – Tiresias
 The Oaks – Shoveler 
 St. Leger Stakes – Antonio

Artistic gymnastics
Germany
 The parallel bars (in German Barren) were invented by German Friedrich Ludwig Jahn in Berlin.

References

 
1819